Todd Anderson (born 2 November 1967) is an Australian former rugby league footballer who played in the 1990s. He played for the Newcastle Knights in 1990 and his only game for the club was in Round 16 1990 against North Sydney at North Sydney Oval which ended in a 28-8 victory.

References

External links
Todd Anderson at Rugby League Project

Australian rugby league players
Newcastle Knights players
Living people
1967 births
Country New South Wales rugby league team players
Rugby league props
Rugby league second-rows